Hackelia cusickii is a species of flowering plant in the borage family known by the common name Cusick's stickseed.

Distribution
The plant is native to the Modoc Plateau in the northeastern corner of California and adjacent sections of Nevada and Oregon.

Description

The hairy inflorescence is an open array of branches, each a coiling panicle of flowers. Each flower is just over a centimeter wide with blue lobes with white appendages at the bases. The boom period is from May to July.

The fruit is a cluster of prickly nutlets.

External links
Calflora Database: Hackelia cusickii (Cusick's stickseed)
Jepson Manual eFlora (TJM2) treatment of  Hackelia cusickii
UC CalPhotos gallery

cusickii
Endemic flora of the United States
Flora of California
Flora of Nevada
Flora of Oregon
Flora of the Great Basin
~
Flora without expected TNC conservation status